Ernest I (2 January 178429 January 1844) was the last sovereign duke of Saxe-Coburg-Saalfeld (as Ernest III) and, from 1826, the first sovereign duke of Saxe-Coburg and Gotha (as Ernest I). He was the father of Albert, Prince Consort, who was the husband of Queen Victoria. Ernest fought against Napoleon Bonaparte, and through construction projects and the establishment of a court theatre, he left a strong imprint on his residence town, Coburg.

Early life
Ernest was born on 2 January 1784. He is the eldest son of Francis, Duke of Saxe-Coburg-Saalfeld, and Countess Augusta of Reuss-Ebersdorf. His youngest brother, Leopold Georg Christian Frederick, was later elected the first King of the Belgians.

On 10 May 1803, aged 19, Ernest was proclaimed an adult because his father had become gravely ill, and he was required to take part in the government of the duchy. When his father died in 1806, he succeeded in the duchy of Saxe-Coburg-Saalfeld as Ernest III. However, he could not immediately take over the formal government of his lands, because the duchy was occupied by Napoleonic troops and was under French administration. The following year, after the Peace of Tilsit (1807), the duchy of Saxe-Coburg-Saalfeld was reunited (having previously been dissolved) and restored to Ernest. This occurred through Russian pressure, since his sister Juliane was married to the brother of the Russian Tsar.

Marriages and children

Ernest married Princess Louise of Saxe-Gotha-Altenburg in Gotha on 31 July 1817. They had two children:
 Ernest II, Duke of Saxe-Coburg and Gotha (21 June 181822 August 1893), who married Princess Alexandrine of Baden on 3 May 1842.
 Prince Albert of Saxe-Coburg and Gotha (26 August 181914 December 1861), who married Queen Victoria of the United Kingdom on 10 February 1840. They had nine children.

The marriage was unhappy because both husband and wife were promiscuous. As the biographer Lytton Strachey put it: "The ducal court was not noted for the strictness of its morals; the Duke was a man of gallantry, and the Duchess followed her husband's example. There were scandals: one of the Court Chamberlains, a charming and cultivated man of Jewish extraction, was talked of; at last there was a separation, followed by a divorce." Ernest and Louise were separated in 1824 and were officially divorced on 31 March 1826. As heirs to Coburg, the children remained with their father. Louise died in 1831.

In Coburg on 23 December 1832, Ernest married his niece Duchess Marie of Württemberg, the daughter of his sister Antoinette. They had no children. This marriage made Marie both Prince Albert's first cousin and his stepmother.

Ernest had three illegitimate children:
 Berta Ernestine von Schauenstein (26 January 1817Coburg, 15 August 1896), born to Sophie Fermepin de Marteaux. She married her first cousin Eduard Edgar Schmidt-Löwe von Löwenfels, the illegitimate son of her father's sister, Juliane.
 Ernst Albert and Robert Ferdinand, twins born in 1838 to Margaretha Braun. They were created Freiherren von Bruneck in 1856.

Estates 
After 1813, Ernest was a Prussian general and participated in military actions against Napoleon. He fought in the battles of Lützen and Leipzig (1813), and drew in 1814 into the French fortress of Mainz. After the battle of Leipzig, he commanded the 5. Armeekorps.

After the defeat of Napoleon in the Battle of Waterloo, the Congress of Vienna on 9 June 1815 gave Ernest an area of 450 square kilometres with 25,000 inhabitants around the town of St. Wendel. Its area was somewhat augmented by the second Treaty of Paris. In 1816, this estate received the name of Principality of Lichtenberg. Ernest sold it to Prussia in 1834.

In 1825, Frederick IV, Duke of Saxe-Gotha-Altenburg, who was the uncle of Ernest's first wife Louise, died without an heir. This resulted in a rearrangement of the Ernestine duchies. It was only as a member of the Ernestine dynasty (and not as Louise's husband) that Ernest had a claim on the late duke's estates. However, he was at that time in the process of divorcing Louise, and the other branches used this as a leverage to drive a better bargain for themselves by insisting that he should not inherit Gotha. They reached a compromise on 12 November 1826: Ernest received Gotha, but had to cede Saalfeld to Saxe-Meiningen. He subsequently became "Ernest I, Duke of Saxe-Coburg and Gotha". Although he had given a constitution to Coburg in 1821, he did not interfere in the system of government in Gotha.

At Coburg, Ernest was responsible for various construction projects, including the establishment of the Hoftheater in its new building. The Schlossplatz as it appears today is largely due to work under his rule. He is chiefly remembered for the economic, educational and constitutional development of his territories, and for the significant international position attained by the house of Coburg.

Death and burial

Honours 
He received the following awards:

Ancestry

References

 August Beck: Ernst I.: Herzog Ernst Anton Karl Ludwig von Sachsen-Koburg-Gotha. In: Allgemeine Deutsche Biographie (ADB). Band 6, Duncker & Humblot, Leipzig 1877, p. 313–317.
 Carl-Christian Dressel: Die Entwicklung von Verfassung und Verwaltung in Sachsen-Coburg 1800–1826 im Vergleich. Duncker & Humblot Berlin 2007, .
 Friedrich Knorr: Ernst I., Herzog von Sachsen-Coburg-Saalfeld. In: Neue Deutsche Biographie (NDB). Band 4, Duncker & Humblot, Berlin 1959, pp. 620.
 Heide Schulz: Freue Dich, Coburg. Die Ode H. C. A. Eichstädts zum Royal Wedding 1840, in: Coburger Geschichtsblätter'' 20, 2012, p. 25–54, ISSN 0947-0336.

1784 births
1844 deaths
People from Coburg
Dukes of Saxe-Coburg and Gotha
Princes of Saxe-Coburg and Gotha
Protestant monarchs
Dukes of Saxe-Coburg-Saalfeld
Burials at the Ducal Family Mausoleum, Glockenburg Cemetery, Coburg
Prussian commanders of the Napoleonic Wars

Recipients of the Order of St. Anna, 1st class
Recipients of the Order of St. George of the Fourth Degree
Grand Crosses of the Order of Saint Stephen of Hungary
Grand Crosses of the Order of Christ (Portugal)
Extra Knights Companion of the Garter
Grand Croix of the Légion d'honneur
Military personnel from Bavaria